The Kansas City Convention Center, originally Bartle Hall Convention Center or Bartle Hall, is a major convention center in downtown Kansas City, Missouri, USA.  It was named for Harold Roe Bartle, a prominent, two-term mayor of Kansas City in the 1950s and early-1960s. Its roof is suspended by four tall art deco inspired pylons, as a component of the Kansas City skyline.

Overview
Kansas City Convention Center is Kansas City's largest complex of multifaceted structures dedicated to meetings and conventions, sports and entertainment. It offers  of column-free exhibit space on one floor,  of tenant finishes, a  conference center, another  of additional space on two levels, 45 meeting rooms, a 2,400-seat fine arts theater, and an arena that can seat over 10,700 people, along with a  ballroom that was scheduled for an April 2007 opening, all connected to major downtown hotels and underground parking by glass-enclosed skywalks and below-ground walkways. A unique Convention Center feature is the expansive Barney Allis Plaza, a public square ideal for outdoor receptions, festivals and concerts.

The interior finishes in the public access areas consist of granite flooring and stairs adjacent to Precast Concrete panels at the Main Entry with Carpet Tile in the Ballroom and Pre-functions. The Ballroom and Pre-function areas feature Metal Panels, wood panels, wood veneer and painted gyp wall surfaces as well as Fabric Wall Panels and Sculptured Glass Fiber Reinforced Gypsum (GFRG) Panels on the interior walls. The Sculptured GFRG Panels create a simulated wave pattern which ties into the water theme of the facility drawing from Kansas City’s origin at the nexus of the Kansas and Missouri rivers. The Grand Ballroom ceilings are finished out in Metal Panel’s bordered at the perimeter walls with Stretched Fabric. The Stretch Fabric ceilings are backlit by a sophisticated LED lighting system that can be programmed to rain the GRGF wall panels in color.

Additionally there are 2 separate Beverage/Ice Service Rooms for catering personnel to service Ballroom functions. These service areas are sealed concrete and resinous flooring in the Kitchen areas with FRP and MDF veneer wall panels. The service area is accessed by 2 separate covered loading docks that can be accessed from the highway.

This canopy also extends the full length of the East Elevation and is supported by Steel Columns and Fixed Blade Steel Sunshades. The Southern Elevation of the building again features a high canopy with Fixed Blade Sunshades and opens onto a Decorative Concrete Plaza designed by Jun Kaneko, a renowned Japanese ceramic artist. This Plaza is complemented by Architectural Precast Concrete retaining walls, concrete stairs and walkways along with decorative concrete monument light pole bases. The remainder of the site is Greenscape consisting of Sodded open area with some 50,000 Kewensis, Sedum and Vinca Minor plants along with thirty-four  caliper Japanese Pagota and Honey Locust trees.

Pylons

The sculptures that crown the pylons, called Sky Stations, were designed by artist R.M. Fischer in 1994. They were primarily inspired by the 1930s Art Deco chandelier and decorative design elements throughout the adjacent Municipal Auditorium. They were placed atop each pillar via helicopter. 

Lightning damage was found to the easternmost Sky Station during an inspection in late 2015. The sculpture was removed for repair on May 8, 2016. The repair project cost $1.6 million, all but $250,000 of which was covered by insurance. The repaired Sky Station was reinstalled on September 18, 2016, and electricians also installed 50 LED lights, as part of the downtown skyline.

Construction 
The expansion of Bartle Hall was a significant technical challenge. Construction of the additional convention space was built over a continuously open six-lane freeway, Interstate 670, which runs underneath the convention center. The result was the creation of the largest, column-free convention environment in the world. The building also was designed and constructed to meet green building standards and achieved a LEED Silver rating, the first City of Kansas City, Missouri project to receive Silver LEED certification.

The general contractor for the project was Walton Construction. The site team included 2 LEED Accredited Professionals documenting and tracking materials, construction methods, recycling and waste management. Architects were HNTB Architects, BNIM; engineers were Henderson Engineers; and multimedia, acoustics, and IT were by Shen Milsom & Wilke.

The total project cost was US$91.7 million, and it was completed on schedule in July 1994.

Gallery

See also
Empire Towers, another artwork by Fischer located in Indianapolis, Indiana

References

American Institute of Architects Guide to Kansas City Architecture & Public Art. (Copyright 2000). American Institute of Architects/KC. Retrieved August 11, 2007. (Page 21, Number 27)

External links

Buildings and structures in Kansas City, Missouri
Economy of Kansas City, Missouri
Convention centers in Missouri
Leadership in Energy and Environmental Design basic silver certified buildings
Art Deco architecture in Missouri
Tourist attractions in Kansas City, Missouri
Downtown Kansas City